Moss Hockey are an ice hockey team in Moss, Norway. The official name of the club is Idrettslaget Kråkene. They currently play in the First Division, the second level of Norwegian ice hockey.

External links
Official website (Norwegian)

References

Ice hockey teams in Norway
Ice hockey clubs established in 1950
1950 establishments in Norway
Sport in Moss, Norway